Fernando David Arce Juárez (born November 27, 1996) is an American professional soccer player who plays as a midfielder for Liga MX club Puebla.

Club career 
Arce is the son of Mexican international footballer Fernando Arce who also played for Tijuana.  Arce came up through the youth systems of Santos Laguna, Monarcas Morelia, and Tijuana.  He made his first team debut for Tijuana as a substitute on March 16, 2014 in a Liga MX game against Cruz Azul.

International career
Because he was born in Chula Vista, California, USA, Arce is eligible for both USA and Mexico.  On July 14, 2014, Arce made his debut for the United States national under-20 team in a 2-1 victory over Chile.

References

External links
 
 
 
 

1996 births
Living people
American soccer players
American sportspeople of Mexican descent
American expatriate soccer players
Club Tijuana footballers
Dorados de Sinaloa footballers
Association football midfielders
Soccer players from California
Sportspeople from Tijuana
Expatriate footballers in Mexico
Liga MX players
United States men's under-20 international soccer players
2015 CONCACAF U-20 Championship players